Duvaliandra is a species of plants in the Apocynaceae first described as a genus in 1980. It contains only one known species, Duvaliandra dioscoridis, native to the Socotra Islands in the Indian Ocean.

References

Endemic flora of Socotra
Asclepiadoideae
Monotypic Apocynaceae genera